Hassan Mohamed Mahmoud (born February 10, 1984) is an Egyptian hammer thrower. He competed at the 2016 Summer Olympics in the men's hammer throw event; his result of 69.87 metres in the qualifying round did not qualify him for the final.

References

1984 births
Living people
Egyptian male hammer throwers
Olympic athletes of Egypt
Athletes (track and field) at the 2016 Summer Olympics
Mediterranean Games silver medalists for Egypt
Mediterranean Games medalists in athletics
African Games medalists in athletics (track and field)
African Games bronze medalists for Egypt
Athletes (track and field) at the 2011 All-Africa Games
Athletes (track and field) at the 2013 Mediterranean Games
21st-century Egyptian people